Bhakta Jayadeva is a 1961 Indian Telugu-language biographical film, based on the life of 12th Century   Sanskrit Poet Jayadeva, produced by Komaravolu Narayana Rao and G. Paramdhama Reddy under the Lalitha Kala Nikethan banner and directed by P. V. Rama Rao, while Ramakrishna took care of direction supervision. It stars Akkineni Nageswara Rao and Anjali Devi, with music composed by Saluri Rajeshwara Rao.

The same picture was already made Telugu in 1938 with the same title, which was produced by Andhra Cinetone at Visakhapatnam and directed by Bengali director Hiren Bose. It stars Surabhi Kamalabai, Santha Kumari, V. Venkateswarlu, Rentachintala Satyanarayana in pivotal roles.

Plot
The film begins with Jayadeva (Akkineni Nageswara Rao) a librettist & orphan, brought by a couple along with their son Parasera (Relangi). Jayadeva writes poems on the divine love of Radhakrishna which are disdained. So, he leaves the house to get acclaim for his literature and lands at an Ashram of a Saint Krishnanda (V. Nagayya) a devotee of Radhakrishna. Here, Krishnanda identifies him as a person born to disseminate the philosophy of Radhakrishna, so, he accommodates him. Once Jayadeva spots people of a village forcibly converting an innocent girl Padmavathi (Anjali Devi) into a Devadasi. Jayadeva protests it and marries Padmavathi which irks village head Kamakeetu (Mukkamala) as he aspires to possess her. At the same time, Parasera arrives and takes them to their hometown. On the way back, Jayadeva acquires a statue of Radhakrishna floating in a river which they start adoring. Meanwhile, Kamakethu reaches Jayadeva's village and slanders Padmavathi for which they are ostracized. At that juncture, Lord Krishna inseminates the devotional power of Jayadeva by punishing the village head. Thereafter, Jayadeva scriptures the book Geeta Govindam which fascinates everyone. Eventually, the king of Puri (C.S.R) also signs poems on Lord Jagannath when he perceives the adulation of Jayadeva, becomes furious and behests to present him in the court. Right Now, both of them keep their poetry before Lord in which Jayadeva is endorsed when the king bows his head down. On his return, Jayadeva is attacked by Kamakeethu when Lakshmanasena Maharaja (Mikkilineni), the king of Navadweepa saves him. Being an advent devotee of Radhakrishna Lakshmanasena invites Jayadeva to his court which envies the remaining poets. Moreover, Kamakeetu hits there too, and adds fuel to their fire. But Jayadeva strives & gains victory over all the scholars in the council when he is highly accoladed. Simultaneously, Jayadeva is about to complete Geeta Govindam but he is cramped at the climax when Lord Krishna appears in his form, completes the book, and takes the hospitality of Padmavathi. Discovering it, the couple's heart is filled with joy when Lakshmanasena also visits and the three of them take the leftover deity. Knowing it, the queen's (Sandhya) ego hurts, besides, she goes with an argument on Sathi. Padmavathi affirms it as a wrong deed the legitimate one is that the wife should spontaneously die listening to her husband's death. At that moment, the queen decides to test her loyalty, so, she proclaims a piece of false news about Jayadeva's death when she too immediately leaves her breath. At last, Jayadeva retrieves Padmavathi alive with his devotional power. Finally, the movie ends on a happy note with Jayadeva & Padmavathi taking salvation into Radhakrishna.

Cast
Akkineni Nageswara Rao as Jayadeva
Anjali Devi as Padmavathi
Relangi as Paraserudu
V. Nagayya as Krishnadas
C.S.R
Mikkilineni as Lakshmanasena Maharaju 
Mukkamala as Kamakeetu
Vangara
Allu Ramalingaiah 
Sandhya as Rani
Surabhi Kamalabai
E. V. Saroja as Dancer

Crew
Art: Gokhale
Choreography: Vempati, Pasumarthi, Gopikrishna
Lyrics - Dialogues: Samudrala Sr
Playback: Ghantasala, P. Susheela, Jikki A. M. Rajah, P. B. Sreenivas, Madhavapeddi Satyam, Ramanujacharyulu
Music: S. Rajeswara Rao
Editing: B. Harinarayanaiah
Cinematography: Venkat
Producer: Komaravolu Narayana Rao, G. Paramdhama Reddy
Screenplay - Director: P. V. Rama Rao
Supervision: P. S. Ramakrishna Rao
Banner: Lalitha Kala Nikethan
Release Date: 7 April 1961

Soundtrack

Music composed by S. Rajeswara Rao. Lyrics were written by Samudrala Sr.

Other
 VCDs & DVDs on - SHALIMAR Video Company, Hyderabad

References

External links
 1938 Bhakta Jayadeva at IMDb.
 1961 Bhakta Jayadeva at IMDb.

1961 films
1960s Telugu-language films
Indian biographical films
1960s biographical films